Lepyronia is a genus of froghoppers in the family Aphrophoridae.

Species
The genus includes the following species:
 Lepyronia angulata Lalleman & Synave, 1955
 Lepyronia angulifera Uhler, 1876
 Lepyronia batrachoides Haupt, 1917
 Lepyronia bifasciata Liu, 1942
 Lepyronia coleoptrata (Linnaeus, 1758)
 Lepyronia daedalia Distant, 1916
 Lepyronia geminata Jacobi, 1921
 Lepyronia gibbosa Ball, 1899
 Lepyronia gracilior Lindberg, 1923
 Lepyronia koreana Matsumura, 1915
 Lepyronia limbata Kato, 1933
 Lepyronia obliqua Jacobi, 1921
 Lepyronia okadae (Matsumura, 1903)
 Lepyronia picta Melichar, 1903
 Lepyronia quadrangularis (Say, 1825)
 Lepyronia sordida Stål, 1864
 Lepyronia v-nigrum Jacobi, 1921

References

Aphrophoridae
Auchenorrhyncha genera